The Democratic Confederation of Labour (CDT) is a national trade union center in Morocco. It was established in 1978.

Traditionally, the CDT was allied with the Socialist Union of Popular Forces (USFP), but in 2002 the union broke its ties and subsequently, secretary general Noubir Amaoui created his own political party.

In 2003, due to internal conflicts, the Democratic Federation of Labour (FDT) was created as a breakaway union.

References

External links
 CDT website.

Trade unions in Morocco
International Confederation of Arab Trade Unions
Economy of the Arab League
Trade unions established in 1978